Birdnest may refer to:
 Bird nest - For birds
 Birdnest wiring - Electronic interconnection used for prototyping and high frequency applications
 Birdnest Records - Swedish punk record company